Simon Andrew Clark is an English keyboard and synthesizer player best known for working alongside guitarist Bill Nelson in art rock band Be-Bop Deluxe and their synthpop offshoot Red Noise. One of his earlier involvements in music was as member of a progressive rock band from Sheffield, Yorkshire, called Mother's Pride.

Life and career
Clark's original involvement with Be Bop Deluxe was as keyboardist for the band's live concerts in 1975. He could not work for them in the recording of their second album Futurama, because he was still maintaining contractual relationship with Mother's Pride. Shortly after, he joined, recording with them the next three studio albums, Sunburst Finish (1976), Modern Music (1977) and Drastic Plastic (1978), as well as the live album, before their disbandment. He was the only full-time member of the band to survive into Nelson's post-Be-Bop Deluxe project . He was known as Andrew rather than Simon because Be-Bop Deluxe drummer Simon Fox insisted that two Simons in the band would cause confusion.

After his involvement with Bill Nelson, Clark played on 's  album (1980), notably its hit single "", The dB's' Stands for Decibels (1981) and Repercussion (1982), Peter Gabriel's So (1986), contributing to "Big Time" and "Don't Give Up", two tracks which likewise became hit singles, and Tears For Fears' The Seeds Of Love (1989).

References

External links
Where Are They Now? People who worked with Bill Nelson as for 2001

English rock keyboardists
Living people
Year of birth missing (living people)
Be-Bop Deluxe members
Bill Nelson's Red Noise members